Sebastián Silva Irarrázabal (born 9 April 1979) is a Chilean director, actor, screenwriter, painter and musician.

Early years 

The second of seven brothers, Sebastián Silva was born in Santiago, Chile on 9 April 1979. After graduating from the Catholic Colegio del Verbo Divino school in Santiago, he spent a year studying filmmaking at the Escuela de Cine de Chile (“Film School of Chile” in Spanish) before leaving to study animation in Montreal, Canada. Here, he mounted the first gallery exhibition of his illustrations and started the band CHC, which went on to record three albums

Silva's second illustration show brought him in contact with Hollywood but a “frustrating period” in Los Angeles, spent pitching to Steven Spielberg and others, brought no tangible results. Leaving Hollywood, Silva started two more bands, Yaia  and Los Mono, the latter of which was signed by British record label Sonic360. He exhibited his art in New York City while writing the script for what would become his first feature, La Vida Me Mata (“Life Kills Me” in Spanish; written with Pedro Peirano).

Career

From first films to Sundance
Back in Chile, Silva recorded a solo album, Iwannawin & Friends  and directed his debut feature, La Vida Me Mata. Released in 2007 by Chilean production company Fabula, La Vida Me Mata went on to win Best Film at the Chilean Pedro Sienna Awards in 2008.

In February 2008, setting aside a script based on his trip to Hollywood, Silva wrote (with Pedro Peirano) and directed his next film: The Maid. The film, released in 2009, told the story of a maid trying to keep her job after having served a family for 23 years. It has won multiple awards, including the Grand Jury Prize - World Cinema Dramatic at the 2009 Sundance Film Festival, and was nominated for Best Foreign Language Film at the 2010 Golden Globes Awards and the 2010 NAACP Image Awards. Film critic David Parkinson called the film "an exceptional study of the emotional investment that domestics make in the families they serve."

International recognition

Silva partnered with Pedro Peirano again to write his next film, Old Cats, which premiered in 2010 at the Valdivia International Film Festival in Chile and at the New York Film Festival in the United States. He then made his TV debut in 2012 when he wrote, directed and produced the HBO short-form TV comedy show The Boring Life of Jacqueline.

The success of The Maid took Silva to Sundance again in 2013 to premiere two new films, Magic Magic and Crystal Fairy, both starring indie actor Michael Cera. Silva won the Sundance Directing Award: World Cinema - Dramatic  for Crystal Fairy and the LA Times described Magic Magic as “an exploration of insanity, selfishness and emotional brutality.” Silva told the LA Times that Cera's character in Magic Magic is "one of my favorite characters I've created in a movie."

Personal life

Silva is openly gay and has spoken about the difficulties he experienced growing up at school:  “I did suffer. I went to a private school, a very tough school ruled by men only, and the law of the jungle. I remember having feminine impulses and just suppressing them. To survive, I guess.”

Filmography

Director and screenplay
La Vida Me Mata (Life Kills Me) (2007)
The Maid (2009) 
Old Cats (2010) with Pedro Peirano
The Boring Life of Jacqueline (TV series, 2012) 
Crystal Fairy and the Magical Cactus (Crystal Fairy y el Cactus Mágico) (2013) 
Magic Magic (2013) 
Nasty Baby (2015)
Dance Dance Dance (2016)
 Tyrel (2018)
Fistful of Dirt (2018)
 Rotting in the Sun (2023)

Actor 
31 minutos, la película (2008)
Nasty Baby (2014)

Discography

CHC (Congregación de Hermanos Contemplativos) 
 Bastante real (2003)
 What it is es lo que es (2004)
 La cosa (2007)

With Yaia
 Goor modning (2004)

With Los Mono
 Somos los que estamos (2007)

Solo
 Iwannawin & Friends (2005)

Awards 
Pedro Sienna Awards 2008: Best Film, La Vida Me Mata
Sundance Festival: Sundance Grand Jury Prize (2009)The Maid 
Altazor Awards 2010: Best Director, The Maid
Pedro Sienna Awards 2010: Best Screenplay, Old Cats (with Pedro Peirano)
Sundance Festival: Directing Award: World Cinema - Dramatic (2013), Crystal Fairy
Teddy Award, Berlin International Film Festival: Best feature film (2015), Nasty Baby

Nominations
2009 Gotham Awards: Best Film, The Maid (with Gregorio González)
2010 Golden Globes Awards: Best Foreign Language Film, The Maid
2010 Independent Spirit Awards: Best Foreign Film, The Maid
2014 Independent Spirit Awards: John Cassavetes Award, Crystal Fairy (with Juan de Dios Larraín & Pablo Larraín)

References

External links 
 
 CineChile.cl page 

Chilean film directors
21st-century Chilean male singers
Chilean people of Basque descent
Living people
Chilean screenwriters
Male screenwriters
Chilean LGBT screenwriters
Chilean LGBT singers
LGBT film directors
Gay singers
Gay screenwriters
1979 births
Chilean gay actors
Chilean gay writers
Chilean gay musicians
20th-century Chilean LGBT people
21st-century Chilean LGBT people